Fatima Sekouane (born 21 May 1983) is a former Algerian women's international footballer who played as a defender.

Club career
Sekouane was formed in AS Intissar Oran, she has played essentially for Intissar and for Afak Relizane in Algeria.

International career
Sekouane is a member of the Algeria women's national football team. She was part of the team at the 2006 African Women's Championship, at the 2010 African Women's Championship, at the 2014 African Women's Championship as the team captain and the 2018 Africa Women Cup of Nations.

References

External links
 
 
 

1983 births
Living people
Footballers from Oran
Algerian women's footballers
Women's association football defenders
Algeria women's international footballers
21st-century Algerian people